This article attempts to list the oldest buildings in the city of Varna, Bulgaria, including the oldest temples and any other surviving structures. In some instances, buildings listed here were reconstructed numerous times and only fragments of the original buildings have survived. Some dates are approximate and based on architectural studies and historical records.
In order to qualify for the list a structure must:
 be a recognisable building (defined as any human-made structure used or intended for supporting or sheltering any use or continuous occupancy);
incorporate features of building work from the claimed date to at least  in height.

This consciously excludes ruins of limited height, roads and statues.

Other structures 
The following are old constructions that do not fit the above criteria for a building, typically because they are ruins that no longer fit the height requirement specified above.

See also 
Timeline of Varna
List of oldest buildings in Sofia

References

Buildings and structures in Varna, Bulgaria